The Scream Awards is an award show dedicated to the horror, sci-fi, and fantasy genres of feature films, hosted and sponsored by Spike TV. The show was created by executive producers Michael Levitt, Cindy Levitt, and Casey Patterson.

Billed simply as Scream 2009, the 2009 ceremony was held at the Greek Theatre in Los Angeles on October 17 and was broadcast on October 27, 2009.

Instead of hosts and musical acts, the show concentrated on the films, showing outtakes from Star Trek, a behind the scenes video from the upcoming New Moon, a new trailer for Shutter Island, among others.

Notable appearances included William Shatner accepting the Ultimate Scream award for J. J. Abrams' reboot of the Star Trek franchise.

This was the first year that the show did not have any musical performances.

Special Awards
Comic-Con Icon Award - Stan Lee
Scream Rock Immortal Award - Keith Richards
Scream Mastermind Award - George A. Romero
Farewell Tribute - Battlestar Galactica
Breakout Movie of the Year - Zombieland
Most Anticipated Fantasy Film - Alice in Wonderland
Most Anticipated Science Fiction Film - Iron Man 2

World Premieres
 Alice in Wonderland presented by Jessica Alba
 Shutter Island presented by Jackie Earle Haley
 V presented by Elizabeth Mitchell
 Star Trek DVD extras presented by John Cho and Karl Urban
 The Twilight Saga: New Moon behind-the-scenes/special effects footage presented by Taylor Lautner

Competitive Categories
Nominees and winners for each announced category are listed below. Winners are listed in boldface.

The Ultimate Scream
 
 Star Trek
 Transformers: Revenge of the Fallen
 Let the Right One In 
 Twilight
 Up
 Drag Me to Hell

Best Horror Movie
 Drag Me to Hell
 Dead Snow
 Friday the 13th
 Let the Right One In
 My Bloody Valentine 3D
 Splinter

Best Science Fiction Movie
 Star Trek
 Knowing
 Moon
 Outlander
 Terminator Salvation
 Transformers: Revenge of the Fallen

Best Fantasy Movie
 Twilight
 Coraline
 Harry Potter and the Half-Blood Prince
 Up
 Watchmen
 X-Men Origins: Wolverine

Best TV Show
 True Blood
 Heroes
 Fringe
 Lost
 Terminator: The Sarah Connor Chronicles
 Dexter

Best Horror Actress
 Anna Paquin, True Blood
 Jennifer Carpenter, Quarantine
 Jaime King, My Bloody Valentine 3D
 Lina Leandersson, Let the Right One In
 Alison Lohman, Drag Me to Hell
 Monica Potter, The Last House on the Left

Best Horror Actor
 Stephen Moyer, True Blood
 Michael C. Hall, Dexter
 Alexander Skarsgård, True Blood
 Kåre Hedebrant, Let the Right One In
 Justin Long, Drag Me to Hell
 Ryan Kwanten, True Blood

Best Fantasy Actress
 Kristen Stewart, Twilight
 Anna Friel, Pushing Daisies
 Scarlett Johansson, The Spirit
 Jaime King, The Spirit
 Rhona Mitra, Underworld: Rise of the Lycans
 Emma Watson, Harry Potter and the Half-Blood Prince

Best Fantasy Actor
 Robert Pattinson, Twilight
 Ed Asner, Up
 Hugh Jackman, X-Men Origins: Wolverine
 Brad Pitt, The Curious Case of Benjamin Button
 Daniel Radcliffe, Harry Potter and the Half-Blood Prince
 Michael Sheen, Underworld: Rise of the Lycans

Best Science Fiction Actress
 Megan Fox, Transformers: Revenge of the Fallen
 Moon Bloodgood, Terminator Salvation
 Eliza Dushku, Dollhouse
 Lena Headey, Terminator: The Sarah Connor Chronicles
 Katee Sackhoff, Battlestar Galactica
 Zoe Saldana, Star Trek

Best Science Fiction Actor
 Chris Pine, Star Trek
 Nicolas Cage, Knowing
 Josh Holloway, Lost
 Shia LaBeouf, Transformers: Revenge of the Fallen
 Zachary Quinto, Star Trek
 Sam Rockwell, Moon

Best Supporting Actress
 Jennifer Carpenter, Dexter
 Ashley Greene, Twilight
 Carla Gugino, Watchmen
 Evanna Lynch, Harry Potter and the Half-Blood Prince
 Shirley Manson, Terminator: The Sarah Connor Chronicles
 Rutina Wesley, True Blood

Best Supporting Actor
 Ryan Reynolds, X-Men Origins: Wolverine
 Simon Pegg, Star Trek
 Leonard Nimoy, Star Trek
 Taylor Kitsch, X-Men Origins: Wolverine
 Rupert Grint, Harry Potter and the Half-Blood Prince
 Nelsan Ellis, True Blood

Breakout Performance-Female
 Isabel Lucas, Transformers: Revenge of the Fallen
 Malin Åkerman, Watchmen
 Lina Leandersson, Let the Right One In
 Lorna Raver, Drag Me to Hell
 Zoe Saldana, Star Trek
 Anna Torv, Fringe

Breakout Performance-Male
 Taylor Lautner, Twilight
 Taylor Kitsch, X-Men Origins: Wolverine
 Robert Pattinson, Twilight
 Chris Pine, Star Trek
 will.i.am, X-Men Origins: Wolverine
 Sam Worthington, Terminator Salvation

Best Cameo
 Winona Ryder, Star Trek
 Helena Bonham Carter, Terminator Salvation
 Kate Beckinsale, Underworld: Rise of the Lycans
 Arnold Schwarzenegger, Terminator Salvation
 Patrick Stewart, X-Men Origins: Wolverine
 Rainn Wilson, Transformers: Revenge of the Fallen

Best Ensemble
 Harry Potter and the Half-Blood Prince
 Battlestar Galactica
 Lost
 Star Trek
 True Blood
 Twilight
 Watchmen

Best Director
 J. J. Abrams, Star Trek
 Michael Bay, Transformers: Revenge of the Fallen
 Tomas Alfredson, Let the Right One In
 Marcus Nispel, Friday the 13th
 Pete Docter and Bob Peterson, Up
 Duncan Jones, Moon
 Sam Raimi, Drag Me to Hell

Best Foreign Movie
 Let the Right One In
 Dead Snow
 Eden Lake
 Martyrs
 Pontypool
 Los Cronocrímenes

Best Sequel
 Transformers: Revenge of the Fallen
 Punisher: War Zone
 Terminator Salvation
 Harry Potter and the Half-Blood Prince
 Underworld: Rise of the Lycans
 X-Men Origins: Wolverine

Best F/X
 Transformers: Revenge of the Fallen
 Drag Me to Hell
 Harry Potter and the Half-Blood Prince
 Star Trek
 Terminator Salvation
 Watchmen

Scream Song of the Year
 "New Divide" by Linkin Park, Transformers: Revenge of the Fallen
 "Bad Things" by Jace Everett, True Blood
 "Decode" by Paramore, Twilight
 "Desolation Row" by My Chemical Romance, Watchmen
 "Other Father Song" by They Might Be Giants, Coraline
 "War Zone" by Rob Zombie, Punisher: War Zone

Best Comic Book Artist
 Steve McNiven, Wolverine: Old Man Logan
 Tony Harris and Jim Clark, "Ex Machina"
 Eric Powell, "The Goon"
 Frank Quitely, "All-Star Superman" and "Batman and Robin"
 Ivan Reis, "Green Lantern"
 John Romita Jr., "The Amazing Spider-Man Volume 1"

Best Villain
 Alexander Skarsgård, True Blood
 Eric Bana, Star Trek
 Helena Bonham Carter, Harry Potter and the Half-Blood Prince
 Cam Gigandet, Twilight
 Lorna Raver, Drag Me to Hell
 Liev Schreiber, X-Men Origins: Wolverine

Best Superhero
 Hugh Jackman as Wolverine, X-Men Origins: Wolverine
 Ray Stevenson as The Punisher, Punisher: War Zone
 Taylor Kitsch as Gambit, X-Men Origins: Wolverine
 Jackie Earle Haley as Rorschach, Watchmen
 Billy Crudup as Doctor Manhattan, Watchmen
 Malin Åkerman as Silk Spectre, Watchmen

Best Scream-Play
 Drag Me to Hell
 Coraline
 Let the Right One In
 Moon
 Star Trek
 Up

Most Memorable Mutilation
 The Pendulum Trap, Saw V
 Arm Removal Surgery, Splinter
 Arms Cut off by Rotary Saw, Watchmen
 Nuked Alive, The Last House on the Left
 The Eyeball Cake, Drag Me to Hell
 Head Ripped Apart by Nazi Zombies, Dead Snow
 The Swimming Pool Scene, Let the Right One In

Fight Scene of the Year
 Kirk v. Spock, Star Trek
 The Car Fight, Drag Me to Hell
 Optimus Prime v. The Fallen, Transformers: Revenge of the Fallen
 Ozymandias v. The Comedian, Watchmen
 Logan and Victor v. Weapon XI, X-Men Origins: Wolverine
 Martin and Roy v. The Nazi Zombies, Dead Snow

Holy Sh!t! Scene of the Year
 The Death Eaters Attack London, Harry Potter and the Half-Blood Prince
 Optimus Prime vs. The Fallen, Transformers: Revenge of the Fallen
 The Subway Crash, Knowing
 The Séance, Drag Me to Hell
 Space Dive, Star Trek
 The Destruction of Manhattan, Watchmen

Best Comic Book
 Green Lantern
 Hack/Slash
 Kick-Ass
 Thor
 The Walking Dead
 Wolverine: Old Man Logan

Best Comic Book Writer
 Geoff Johns
 Brian Michael Bendis
 Joe Hill
 Grant Morrison
 Mark Millar
 Brian K. Vaughan

Best Comic Book Movie
 Watchmen
 Dragonball Evolution
 Punisher: War Zone
 The Spirit
 X-Men Origins: Wolverine

See also
 Saturn Award

References

External links

Scream Awards